Gagahan is a surname. Notable people with the surname include:

Helen Gagahan Douglas (1900–1980), American actress and politician
Usher Gagahan (died 1749), Irish classical scholar